Estadio Los Chankas is a multi-use stadium in Andahuaylas, Peru. It is currently used mostly for football matches and is the home stadium of José María Arguedas de Andahuaylas of the Copa Perú. The stadium holds 10,000 spectators.

Los Chankas
Buildings and structures in Apurímac Region